Carlo Alberto Nucci  is full professor of Electrical Power Systems at the University of Bologna and the Editor in Chief of the Electric Power System Research Journal. He authored or co-authored over 200 science papers in the field of power electrical engineering. Fellow of IEEE and IET.
He has also been Chair of the IEEE PowerTech Permanent Steering Committee. Nucci is head of the Power Systems Laboratory at the University of Bologna. Together with prof. F. Rachidi  of the Swiss Federal Institute of Technology of Lausanne, he has developed a computer code for the appraisal of lightning-induced voltages in electrical network, called LIOV, which is quoted in IEEE standards. Prof. Nucci is also member of the Bologna Science Academy.

His research is currently focused on:
    Power systems electromagnetic transients
    Lightning protection of power systems
    Smart Grids - Distributed generation
    Dynamics of power systems
    Secondary cell for electric vehicles

Career 
Nucci received a degree with honors from the University of Bologna, Italy  in 1982. In the same University he was appointed a researcher in Power Electrical Engineering in 1983, became a full professor and the chair of Power Systems in 2000.
He serves as the chair of Study Committee C4 in Cigre International Council on Large Electric Systems.
Since January 2010 he has been the Editor in Chief of the Electric Power System Research journal.

Personal life 
Carlo Alberto Nucci was born in Bologna, Italy, in 1956.

References

External links

Academic staff of the University of Bologna
Fellows of the Institution of Engineering and Technology
Fellow Members of the IEEE
Living people
1956 births
Engineers from Bologna
University of Bologna alumni